Saros cycle series 128 for lunar eclipses occurs at the moon's ascending node, repeating every 18 years 11 and 1/3 days. It contains 71 events. Solar saros 135 interleaves with this lunar saros with an event occurring every 9 years 5 days alternating between each saros series.

This lunar saros is linked to Solar Saros 135.

Lunar Saros 128 
Solar Saros 135 interleaves with this lunar saros with an event occurring every 9 years 5 days alternating between each saros series.

Summary

Lunar Saros 128 contains 15 total lunar eclipses between 1845 and 2097 (in years 1845, 1863, 1881, 1899, 1917, 1935, 1953, 1971, 1989, 2007, 2025, 2043, 2061, 2079 and 2097). Solar Saros 135 interleaves with this lunar saros with an event occurring every 9 years 5 days alternating between each saros series.

List

See also 
 List of lunar eclipses
 List of Saros series for lunar eclipses

Notes

External links 
 www.hermit.org: Saros 128

Lunar saros series